MNX is an Indian English language movie television channel. It was launched on 24 June 2016 as Movies Now 2 from The Times Group. On 15 July 2017, it was rebranded as MNX channel, focused on Hollywood films.

It has exclusive content licensing from films produced or distributed by MGM and has content licensing from Universal Studios, Walt Disney Studios, Marvel Studios, 20th Century Studios, Warner Bros and Paramount Pictures.

See also 
Movies Now
The Times Group

References

Television in India
Television channels and stations established in 2016
Television stations in Mumbai
Movie channels in India
English-language television stations in India
2016 establishments in India
Television channels of The Times Group